Ali Sayed Darwish (10 April 1977 – 2 January 2001) was an Emirati cyclist. He competed in the men's individual road race at the 1996 Summer Olympics. He was killed in a car accident while riding in Dubai.

References

External links
 

1977 births
2001 deaths
Emirati male cyclists
Olympic cyclists of the United Arab Emirates
Cyclists at the 1996 Summer Olympics
Place of birth missing
Cyclists at the 1998 Asian Games
Asian Games competitors for the United Arab Emirates
Road incident deaths in the United Arab Emirates